Livera is a small village on Cape Kormakitis, Cyprus, 8 km northwest of Kormakitis. De facto, it is under the control of Northern Cyprus. The Beşparmak Trail starts at Cape Kormakitis and Sadrazamköy is the first village it traverses.

References

Communities in Kyrenia District
Populated places in Girne District